Lúcio Flávio may refer to:
Lúcio Flávio dos Santos (born 1979), a Brazilian footballer 
Lúcio Flávio da Silva Oliva (born 1986), a Brazilian footballer 
Lúcio Flávio Pinto, a Brazilian journalist
Lucio Flavio (film), a 1977 Brazilian film directed by Héctor Babenco